Rockwood was a provincial electoral division in Manitoba, Canada.  It was created with the province's first redistribution in 1874, and changed by the 1955 redistribution in advance of the 1958 provincial election - it was merged with what was left of the old Iberville district to form Rockwood-Iberville.

Provincial representatives

Former provincial electoral districts of Manitoba
1874 establishments in Manitoba